Thomas Cunningham Cochran (November 30, 1877 – December 10, 1957) was an American lawyer and Republican member of the U.S. House of Representatives from Pennsylvania for four terms from 1927 to 1935.

Early life and career
Thomas C. Cochran was born in Sandy Creek Township, Pennsylvania (near Sheakleyville, Pennsylvania).  He moved with his parents to Mercer, Pennsylvania, in 1879.  He graduated from the Mercer High School in 1896 and from Westminster College in New Wilmington, Pennsylvania, in 1901.  He was a member of the Sigma Phi Epsilon fraternity.  He was a member of the faculty of Mercer Academy in 1902 and 1903.  He studied law, and was admitted to the bar in 1903.  He commenced practice in Mercer, Pennsylvania.  He was district attorney of Mercer County, Pennsylvania, from 1906 to 1909.  He was a trustee of Westminster College.

Congress
Cochran was elected as a Republican to the Seventieth and to the three succeeding Congresses.  He was not a candidate for renomination in 1934.

Later career and death
After his time in Congress, he served as a delegate to the Inter-Parliamentary Union Conferences in Paris, France, in 1927, Berlin, Germany, in 1928, Geneva, Switzerland, in 1929, London, England, in 1930, and Istanbul, Turkey, in 1934, and as an observer in Oslo, Norway, in 1939, Istanbul in 1951, and Washington, D.C. in 1953.

He resumed the practice of law, and died in Mercer.  Interment in Mercer Citizens Cemetery.

Sources

The Political Graveyard

1877 births
1957 deaths
People from Mercer, Pennsylvania
Westminster College (Pennsylvania) alumni
Republican Party members of the United States House of Representatives from Pennsylvania